Rosamond is a unincorporated community in Kern County, California, US, near the Los Angeles county line. Rosamond is part of Greater Los Angeles and is located in the Mojave Desert just north of Lancaster and Palmdale, two of the largest cities in Antelope Valley. As of the 2010 Census, Rosamond's population was 18,150. For statistical purposes, the United States Census Bureau has defined Rosamond as a census-designated place (CDP).

Rosamond is a suburban bedroom community with many residents employed by nearby Edwards Air Force Base or commuting to Los Angeles, Lancaster, and Palmdale for work. The town is about 15 minutes north of the Lancaster Metrolink station providing direct access to Los Angeles Union Station in just two hours.

History
Rosamond was established in 1877 as a townsite owned by the Southern Pacific Railroad; it was named for the daughter of one of the railroad's officials. The first local industries were mining and cattle. During the 1890s, gold was discovered in the area, quickly drawing miners and prospectors. After the initial boom, gold mining gradually declined, though it had a second, smaller boom during the 1930s. In 1933, Muroc Army Air Field was established some  miles away; it was later renamed Edwards Air Force Base in honor of fallen test pilot Glenn Edwards.

The Rosamond post office opened in 1885, closed in 1887, and re-opened in 1888.

1932 Ford V-8 endurance test
In July 1932, racing driver Eddie Pullen and his team demonstrated  the endurance of the newly developed Ford V-8 engine, by driving a Ford V-8, model 18,  in 33 days, in the Mojave desert. Fuel consumption averaged .

Geography
Rosamond sits in the northern end of the Antelope Valley, the westernmost valley of the Mojave Desert. Some cities and communities within the trading area of Rosamond include Lancaster, Palmdale, Hi Vista, Roosevelt, Redman, Lake Los Angeles, Quartz Hill, Ridgecrest, and Santa Clarita. Residents of these desert cities and unincorporated communities share Sierra Highway, Angeles Forest Highway, Angeles Crest Highway (State Route 2), and the Antelope Valley Freeway (State Route 14) for commutes to the San Fernando Valley and Los Angeles Basin in order to get to work.

Willow Springs lies west of central Rosamond and was a watering hole for stagecoach travelers for generations, though its springs have dried up. Willow Springs Raceway is nearby, which hosts a variety of motor racing events, attracting people from all over Southern California and beyond.

The Census Bureau definition of the area may not precisely correspond to the local understanding of the historical area of the community.

Demographics

2010
At the 2010 census Rosamond had a population of 18,150. The racial makeup of Rosamond was 11,294 (62.2%) White, 1,476 (8.1%) African American, 221 (1.2%) Native American, 658 (3.6%) Asian, 66 (0.4%) Pacific Islander, 3,258 (18.0%) from other races, and 1,177 (6.5%) from two or more races. Hispanic or Latino of any race were 6,230 persons (34.3%)

The census reported that 18,145 people (100% of the population) lived in households, 5 (0%) lived in non-institutionalized group quarters, and no one was institutionalized.

There were 6,197 households, 2,603 (42.0%) had children under the age of 18 living in them, 3,254 (52.5%) were opposite-sex married couples living together, 843 (13.6%) had a female householder with no husband present, 390 (6.3%) had a male householder with no wife present. There were 432 (7.0%) unmarried opposite-sex partnerships, and 40 (0.6%) same-sex married couples or partnerships. 1,317 households (21.3%) were one person and 342 (5.5%) had someone living alone who was 65 or older. The average household size was 2.93. There were 4,487 families (72.4% of households); the average family size was 3.43.

The age distribution was 5,290 people (29.1%) under the age of 18, 1,956 people (10.8%) aged 18 to 24, 4,708 people (25.9%) aged 25 to 44, 4,716 people (26.0%) aged 45 to 64, and 1,480 people (8.2%) who were 65 or older. The median age was 32.0 years. For every 100 females, there were 100.6 males.  For every 100 females age 18 and over, there were 100.2 males.

There were 6,968 housing units at an average density of 133.1 per square mile, of the occupied units 4,202 (67.8%) were owner-occupied and 1,995 (32.2%) were rented. The homeowner vacancy rate was 4.5%; the rental vacancy rate was 12.7%. 12,388 people (68.3% of the population) lived in owner-occupied housing units and 5,757 people (31.7%) lived in rental housing units.

2000
At the 2000 census there were 14,349 people, 4,988 households, and 3,626 families in the CDP. The racial makeup of the CDP was 72.0% White, 6.6% Black or African American, 1.3% Native American, 3.0% Asian, 0.2% Pacific Islander, 11.7% from other races, and 5.2% from two or more races.
Of the 4,988 households 41.2% had children under the age of 18 living with them, 54.7% were married couples living together, 12.5% had a female householder with no husband present, and 27.3% were non-families. 21.9% of households were one person and 6.2% were one person aged 65 or older. The average household size was 2.88 and the average family size was 3.38.

The age distribution was 32.9% under the age of 18, 7.9% from 18 to 24, 32.0% from 25 to 44, 19.3% from 45 to 64, and 7.9% 65 or older. The median age was 33 years. For every 100 females, there were 102.4 males. For every 100 females age 18 and over, there were 101.5 males.

The median household income was $42,307 and the median family income was $46,918. Males had a median income of $42,484 versus $26,745 for females. The per capita income for the CDP was $17,440. About 11.6% of families and 14.1% of the population were below the poverty line, including 19.2%
of those under age 18 and 12.0% of those age 65 or over.

Education
There are five schools in Rosamond: Rosamond Elementary School, West Park Elementary School, Tropico Middle School, Rosamond High School and Rare Earth High School (alternative education).

There also was a special education schooling facility that went by the name "Ascend Academy". It got defunded by the Southern Kern Unified School District (SKUSD) in mid-2019.

Transportation
Rosamond sits along the California State Route 14, also known as the Antelope Highway, providing direct access to Los Angeles to the south and Mojave to the north.

Bus service from Rosamond to Bakersfield and Lancaster is provided by Kern Transit. The nearest Metrolink station is located about 15 minutes south in Lancaster. Expansion of the Metrolink train north to Rosamond has been discussed in a 2012 Kern County Council of Governments report.

Notable people

Kay Ryan, poet and writer
John Quade, actor

References

 
Census-designated places in Kern County, California
Populated places in the Mojave Desert
Populated places established in 1877
Antelope Valley
Census-designated places in California
1877 establishments in California